A Doctor of Juridical Science (SJD), or a Doctor of the Science of Law (JSD), is a research doctorate in law equivalent to the more commonly awarded Doctor of Philosophy degree.

Australia
The SJD is offered by the Australian National University, Bond University, La Trobe University, the University of Canberra, the University of New South Wales, the University of Sydney, the University of Technology Sydney, and the University of Western Australia. It was once offered by the Queensland University of Technology.

Canada 
In Canada, the JSD or SJD is only offered at the University of Toronto. The University of Toronto's Faculty of Law is the leading institution from which Canadian law professors may earn a Doctorate of Juridical Science. Other law schools in Canada still offer a PhD in law as the terminal degree.

United States
The JSD, or SJD is a research doctorate, and as such, in contrast to the JD, it is equivalent to the more commonly awarded research doctorate, the PhD It is considered the "most advanced law degree" by Georgetown Law Center, Cornell University, Harvard Law School, Columbia Law School, Yale Law School, NYU Law, Penn Law, Stanford Law, UVA Law, Duke Law School, Berkeley Law, UCLA School of Law, Washington University School of Law, George Washington University Law School, University of Arizona James E. Rogers College of Law, and University of Illinois College of Law. According to Indiana University it is the "terminal degree in law designed for individuals interested in academia." The National Association of Legal Professionals states that the JSD/SJD is "the most advanced (or terminal) law degree that would follow the earning of the JD and LLM degrees".

Applicants for the program must have outstanding academic credentials. A first degree in law (such as a JD) is required, as well as an LLM Exceptions as to the latter condition (i.e. holding an LLM) are seldom—if ever—granted.

The JSD/SJD typically requires three to five years to complete. The program begins with a combination of required and elective coursework. Then, upon passage of the oral exam, the student advances to doctoral candidacy. Completion of the program requires a dissertation, which serves as an original contribution to the scholarly field of law.

Despite its terminal status, the JSD/SJD is rarely earned by American scholars. The American Bar Association considers the first-level JD a sufficient academic credential for the instruction of the law. This has been adopted by virtually all American law schools, though outstanding academic performance and an extensive record of legal publications are usually required for tenure-track employment at most universities. Most scholars who complete the JSD/SJD at American universities are either international students seeking academic employment in their home countries (where a research doctorate may be required) or American scholars already employed, and who wish to further their legal education at the highest level.

Notable recipients of the degree of Doctor of Juridical Science include:

 Sang-Hyun Song (Cornell Law School, 1970), President of the International Criminal Court (ICC)
 Harvey L. Strelzin (New York University, 1906), New York State Assembly member and professor at New York University.
 Lobsang Sangay (Harvard, 2004), former President of the Central Tibetan Administration and professor of law at Harvard University 
 Charles Hamilton Houston (Harvard, 1923), prominent civil rights attorney
 Lowell Turrentine (Harvard, 1929), prominent professor of law at Stanford University
 Justice Bernard Jefferson (Harvard, 1934), renowned legal scholar and appellate court judge
 Pauli Murray (Yale, 1965), prominent civil rights advocate
 Ayala Procaccia (University of Pennsylvania, 1972), Israel Supreme Court Justice
 John Cencich (Notre Dame Law School, 2008), Professor and former senior United Nations war crimes investigator at the International Criminal Tribunal for the former Yugoslavia at The Hague.
Dionysia-Theodora Avgerinopoulou (Columbia, 2011), member of the Hellenic Parliament
 Christos Rozakis (University of Illinois, 1973) (President of the Administrative Tribunal of the Council of Europe and former vice-president of the European Court of Human Rights)
 Ma Ying-jeou (Harvard, 1980), President of the Republic of China
 Theodor Meron (Harvard), professor of law (New York University) and president of the International Criminal Tribunal for the Former Yugoslavia
 Dhananjaya Y. Chandrachud (Harvard, 1986), Justice of the Supreme Court of India
 Hanoch Dagan, (Yale, 1993), Stewart and Judy Colton Professor of Legal Theory and Innovation and former Dean of Tel Aviv University Faculty of Law, Justin D'Atri Visiting Professor of Law at Columbia University
Katherine Franke (Yale Law School, 1998), Sulzbacher Professor of Law, Gender, and Sexuality Studies, Columbia University; Director, Center for Gender and Sexuality Law at Columbia Law School; Faculty Director, The Law, Rights, and Religion Project at Columbia Law School
W. Michael Reisman (Yale Law School 1965), Myres S. McDougal Professor of International Law at Yale Law School
 Lucian Bebchuk (Harvard, 1984), William J. Friedman and Alicia Townsend Friedman Professor of Law, Economics, and Finance Director, Program on Corporate Governance, Harvard Law School.
Xue Hanqin (Columbia, 1995), U.N. International Court of Justice judge
 Oren Bar Gill (Harvard). Professor of Law, Harvard Law School.
 Omri Ben-Shahar (Harvard). Professor of Law, Chicago Law School.
 George Triantis (Stanford). Professor of Law, Stanford Law School.
 Robert Merges (Columbia). Professor of Law, Berkeley Law.

See also
 Doctor of Law
 Legum Doctor (Doctor of Laws; LLD)
 Juris Doctor (JD)
 Master of Laws (LLM)
 Bachelor of Laws (LLB)
 Doctor of Canon Law, Catholic Church (JCD)

Notes and references

Laws
Law degrees